Beheshti Metro Station is a station in Tehran Metro Line 1. It is located in the junction of Dr. Mofatteh Street and Beheshti Street. It is the intersection of Line 1 and Line 3. It is between Shahid Mofatteh Metro Station and Mosalla Metro Station on Line 1 and Mirzaye Shirazi Metro Station and Sohrevardi Metro Station on Line 3.

References

Tehran Metro stations